The 1909–10 Scottish Division Two was won by Leith Athletic and Raith Rovers, with Ayr Parkhouse finishing bottom.

Table

References 

 Scottish Football Archive

Scottish Division Two seasons
2